Brian Geary (14 December 1912 – 29 January 1981) was an  Australian rules footballer who played with Hawthorn and North Melbourne in the Victorian Football League (VFL).

Notes

External links 

1912 births
1981 deaths
Australian rules footballers from Victoria (Australia)
Hawthorn Football Club players
North Melbourne Football Club players
Shepparton Football Club players